Gabriela Tafur Náder (born 7 July 1995) is a Colombian lawyer, model and beauty pageant titleholder who was crowned Señorita Colombia 2018 (Miss Colombia 2018-2019). She represented Colombia at Miss Universe 2019 and placed in the Top 5.

Early life and education 
Tafur was born in Cali on 7 July 1995 to parents Octavio Tafur and Olga Liliana Náder. She is of Lebanese descent (on her mother's side); her grandfather was originally from Chartoun, Aley District in Lebanon, and immigrated to Colombia during the Lebanese Civil War. At the age of four, she started to play the violin while attending Arboleda Academy. 

After graduating from Colegio Bolivar in Cali, Tafur moved to Bogotá to study law at the University of Los Andes, where she graduated cum laude. After graduation, she worked as a lawyer in the legal department of Microsoft Colombia, and also acted as a coordinator for the commercial law specialization at the University of Los Andes.

Career 
Tafur began her modeling career as a teenager in 2009, after being selected for a modeling show in her hometown of Cali. This show led Tafur to begin a professional career as a model.

Pageantry

Miss Colombia 2018

In 2018, Tafur competed in the Miss Colombia 2018 pageant in Cartagena, Colombia. She was ultimately hailed the winner, and was crowned by outgoing titleholder Valeria Morales. Tafur won two supplementary titles during the competition: Miss Punctuality Bulova and Queen of the Police. With her win, Tafur became the twelfth Miss Colombia winner to come from the Valle Department, the most successful department in terms of Miss Colombia titleholders. 

As Miss Colombia, she was invited to the Lebanese diaspora energy conference held in Lebanon in June 2019.

Miss Universe 2019

Tafur represented Colombia at the Miss Universe 2019 pageant and was placed as a Top 5 finalist together with Paweensuda Drouin of Thailand.

References

External links
 Official Miss Colombia website

1995 births
Colombian beauty pageant winners
Colombian female models
Colombian people of Lebanese descent
Colombian women lawyers
Living people
Miss Colombia winners
Miss Universe 2019 contestants
People from Cali
University of Los Andes (Colombia) alumni
21st-century Colombian lawyers